The 1892 United States presidential election in Pennsylvania took place on November 8, 1892, as part of the 1892 United States presidential election. Voters chose 32 representatives, or electors to the Electoral College, who voted for president and vice president.

Pennsylvania voted for the Republican nominee, incumbent President Benjamin Harrison, over the Democratic nominee, former President Grover Cleveland, who was running for a second, non-consecutive term. Harrison won Pennsylvania by a margin of 6.36%; however, this remains the last occasion a Democratic candidate has ever won northeastern Wayne County, which had regularly voted Democratic during the Third Party System.

With 51.45% of the popular vote, Pennsylvania would prove to be Harrison's fourth strongest victory in terms of percentage in the popular vote after Vermont, Maine and Massachusetts.

Results

Results by county

See also
 List of United States presidential elections in Pennsylvania

References

Pennsylvania
1892
1892 Pennsylvania elections